Lauren Alex Scott is an American politician, civil rights activist and entrepreneur. In the June 2014 primary election, she won the Republican nomination for the Nevada Assembly's 30th District, earning 58% of the vote. Scott received 46% of the vote in the November 2014 general election and lost the election to incumbent Democrat Michael Sprinkle.
 

Nevada Governor Brian Sandoval appointed Scott to the Nevada Equal Rights Commission (NERC) in 2012.

Politics

2012 campaign
In the 2012 Republican primary election for Nevada Assembly District 30, Scott received 21 percent of the vote in her bid for the seat vacated by Democrat Debbie Smith. By garnering 65 percent of the vote, Ken Lightfoot won the Republican nomination during that election, defeating Scott and Paul Maineri.

In the general election, Ken Lightfoot lost the election with 43 percent to Michael Sprinkle's 57 percent.

2014 campaign
Scott lost the 2014 general election campaign to incumbent Democrat Michael Sprinkle.

Scott won the Nevada Assembly District 30 primary election by receiving 58 percent of the vote, allowing her to advance and represent the Republican Party in November to challenge the current Democratic incumbent, State Assemblyman Michael Sprinkle. Adam Khan unsuccessfully ran against Scott in the primary, winning 42 percent of the vote. Nevada Governor Brian Sandoval endorsed Scott, while Khan had received the endorsement of the Nevada Republican Assembly (NVRA).

2016 campaign
Scott announced that she would run again for the Nevada Assembly District 30 seat in 2016.

Civil rights activism
Scott founded Equality Nevada, Inc. in 2009 and served as the Executive Director from 2009 through 2015. Equality Nevada was organized to fight for LGBTQ equality in Nevada and it was voted one of the top grassroots organizations in Northern Nevada in 2009.

Scott supported the repeal of the military "Don't ask, don't tell" policy in 2010. A ban on military service by openly gay and lesbian service members was ruled as a violation of the US Constitution in Log Cabin Republicans v. United States of America in 2011.

In the 2011 legislative session, Scott continued to work to advance civil rights in Nevada. By working with members of the American Civil Liberties Union (ACLU), Nevada Women's Lobby and the Progressive Leadership Alliance of Nevada (PLAN), she was able to help secure the passage of transgender inclusive civil rights legislation for the first time in Nevada. She has been recognized on the floor of both the Nevada Assembly and the Senate.

During the 2013 Nevada legislative session Scott testified in support of SB139, a bill to add 'gender identity and expression' to the state hate crime statutes. The bill was signed by Governor Brian Sandoval on May 21, 2013.

Post transition life
After resigning her position as Electrical Design Manager at Plasma-Therm in 1998, Scott began her gender transition in 1999 while living in Clearwater, Florida. She co-founded a start-up company that produced high voltage power supplies, which was later acquired and rebranded as Gripping Power, Inc. in 2002.

Scott was employed as an electrical systems engineer at Biodiesel Solutions in 2007. She was laid off when Biodiesel Solutions ceased operations in 2008. She has worked as a consultant,  on business development and renewable energy issues since then.

She founded and became the president and CEO of Alkcon Corporation in 2013.

Education
Scott graduated with honors from St. Leo University with a Bachelor of Business Administration, with specializations in technology management and information systems, in 1994.

Military service

Scott enlisted in the US Air Force in 1986 and worked as a firefighter until she received an honorable discharge in 1994.

References

External links
 
 Not A Good Night For Trans Candidates Either by Monica Roberts (November 5, 2014), TransGriot
 Nevada might get its first transgender legislator — and she’s Republican by Whip Villarreal (July 5, 2014), Las Vegas Review-Journal
 Republicans Elect Their First Ever Transgender Candidate In Party Primary by Jean Ann Esselink (June 13, 2014) The New Civil Rights Movement
 Nevada Republican Could Become Nation's First Transgender State Legislator by Samantha Lachman (June 12, 2014) The Huffington Post
 US: Trans candidate wins Nevada Republican primary by Nick Duffy (June 12, 2014) Pink News
 Nev.'s Scott Could Be Nation's First Transgender State Legislator by Neal Broverman (March 19, 2012), The Advocate

1963 births
Living people
American LGBT military personnel
Transgender military personnel
LGBT people from Nevada
Nevada Republicans
Politicians from Milwaukee
Politicians from Reno, Nevada
Saint Leo University alumni
Transgender politicians
Transgender women
United States Air Force airmen
Women in the United States Air Force